Shatto is a surname. Notable people with the surname include:

Bart Shatto, American theatre actor-singer
Cindy Shatto (1957–2011), Canadian diver
Dick Shatto (1933–2003), Canadian football player

See also
Shatto, West Virginia, an unincorporated community in Jackson County